Grace Mukomberanwa (born 1944) is a Zimbabwean sculptor.

Mukomberanwa is a first-generation soapstone sculptor of Shona art. She was the wife of renowned first generation artist Nicholas Mukomberanwa. They both trained in soapstone sculptor and then trained their children in the same craft. She was one of the leading female sculptors in Zimbabwe. Her work has been exhibited in galleries around the world.

She is a member of the Mukomberanwa family, who are renowned sculptors. Mukomberanwa was the wife of Nicholas Mukomberanwa. She was the mother of sons Anderson, Lawrence Mukomberanwa, Tendai, Taguma, daughters Netsai, and Ennica Mukomberanwa, and the aunt of Nesbert Mukomberanwa, all of whom are sculptors.

References

External links
Joseph Wise Gallery

1944 births
Living people
Zimbabwean women sculptors
20th-century Zimbabwean women artists
21st-century Zimbabwean women artists
Women stone carvers
20th-century Zimbabwean sculptors
21st-century Zimbabwean sculptors